Brenton Andre Morel (born April 21, 1987) is a former American professional baseball third baseman. He previously played for the Chicago White Sox and Pittsburgh Pirates.

Career
Morel attended Centennial High School in Bakersfield, California, and California Polytechnic State University in San Luis Obispo, California, where he played college baseball for the Cal Poly Mustangs.

Chicago White Sox

Morel was drafted by the Chicago White Sox in the third round of the 2008 Major League Baseball Draft. He was called up to the majors for the first time on September 2, 2010. He had his first major league hit and home run in the same at bat on September 10 against Kansas City Royals pitcher Bruce Chen.

Toronto Blue Jays
Morel was claimed off waivers by the Toronto Blue Jays on December 23, 2013. He was designated for assignment on February 21, 2014, to make room for Liam Hendriks.

Pittsburgh Pirates
Morel was claimed off waivers by the Pittsburgh Pirates on February 24, 2014. He was optioned to the Triple-A Indianapolis Indians on March 21, 2014. He was recalled on May 9, 2014. He was outrighted off the roster on November 20, 2014. On July 25, 2015, he was designated for assignment. Rather than accepting an outright assignment to Triple-A, he became a free agent.

Oakland Athletics
Morel signed a minor league contract with the Oakland Athletics on July 30, 2015. He played the rest of the 2015 season with the Triple-A Nashville Sounds and elected to become a free agent after the season.

Orix Buffaloes

Morel signed with the Orix Buffaloes of Nippon Professional Baseball for the 2016 season. He then signed again for the 2017 season.

On December 2, 2017, he became a free agent, and announced his retirement from professional baseball.

References

External links

1987 births
Living people
American expatriate baseball players in Japan
Baseball players from Bakersfield, California
Birmingham Barons players
Cal Poly Mustangs baseball players
Charlotte Knights players
Chicago White Sox players
Great Falls Voyagers players
Indianapolis Indians players
Kannapolis Intimidators players
Major League Baseball third basemen
Nashville Sounds players
Nippon Professional Baseball first basemen
Nippon Professional Baseball second basemen
Nippon Professional Baseball third basemen
Orix Buffaloes players
Peoria Javelinas players
Pittsburgh Pirates players
Winston-Salem Dash players